Elkhanah Pulitzer is an American stage director and librettist who primarily works in opera. She was an assistant director at San Francisco Opera from 2008 to 2013 and was the artistic curator for SF Opera Lab. Since 2010, Pulitzer has worked extensively with West Edge Opera, an experimental opera company in the East Bay. She also serves as board vice president for the Pulitzer Arts Foundation.

Works

Personal life 
Pulitzer was born in Boston, Massachusetts, and raised in St. Louis, Missouri. She now lives in El Cerrito, California. She is the great-great-granddaughter of Joseph Pulitzer.

References 

Living people
Women theatre directors
Female opera directors
American opera directors
American theatre directors
American people of Hungarian-Jewish descent
Year of birth missing (living people)
Musicians from Boston
Musicians from St. Louis